Hongxi (理親王 弘晳; 25 August 1694 – 26 October 1742), was the second son of the Crown Prince Yinreng and the grandson of Kangxi Emperor. His mother is Lady Ligiya, the secondary consort of Yunreng.

Life 
Hongxi was born on July 25th in the 33rd year of Kangxi. Hongxi was cultivated by his grandfather Emperor Kangxi since childhood. He was adopted by Imperial Princess Consort Limi, of the Gūwalgiya clan.

In the 53rd year of Kangxi (1714), the envoys sent by the King of Joseon returned to the country and expressed to the King the emperor intention: ''Hongxi is quite virtuous, it is difficult to abolish Yunreng"

On November 13th, the 61st year of Kangxi (December 20, 1722), the palace rumoured that Emperor Kangxi would only prepare a special title of Prince for Hongxi.

On November 13th, the 61st year of Kangxi (December 20, 1722), the palace rumoured that Emperor Kangxi would only prepare a special title of Prince for his grandson Hongxi. The second son of the prince Yunreng, was the favourite of his grandfather.

After his uncle, Yinzhen, became emperor he was awarded with the title of  Prince Li.The relationship between Emperor Yongzheng and Hongxi was harmonious. 

He held the title Prince Li of the Second Rank from 1723 to 1728, and was promoted to Prince Li of the First Rank in 1728. He was stripped of his title in 1739. Hongxi organised  an unsuccessful coup d'etat organised against the emperor in 1739. The list of participants included 6 princes: Hongxi, Hongsheng, Hongpu, Hongchang, Hongjiao and Yunlu.

Family 
Parents:
 Father: Yunreng, Prince Limi of the First Rank.
 Biological Mother: Secondary Consort, of the Ligiya clan (側福晉 李佳氏)
Adoptive Mother: Imperial Princess Consort Limi, of the Gūwalgiya clan (和碩亲王福晋 瓜爾佳氏; d. July/August 1718) 
Consorts and issues:
Primary Consort of the  Kharchin  Ulanghan clan (科爾沁部烏朗罕濟爾默氏)
 Yongchen (永琛; 1712 －1766 ), Second class imperial guard (二等侍衛), first son
 Yonglin (永琳; 1714－1739), second son
 Concubine, of the Zhao clan  (兆氏)
 Yongmei (永玫; 1714－1788), third son
 Yongshao (永玿; 1720－1762), eight son
 Yonghuai (永淮;1728－1793), Third rank military official (護軍參領), fourteenth son
 Fourth daughter
 Concubine, of the Qiang clan (強氏)
 Yongxun (永珣; 1714－1756), Third-class imperial guard (三等侍衛), fourth son
 Sixth son (1718－1719）
 Yongju (永琚; 1720－1765), ninth son
 Yongtian (永琠; 1721－1772), tenth son
 Yongji (永積; 1734－1754), seventeenth son
 Lady of the Second Rank (县君), first daughter
Married Tsewangjab of the Gorlosi (郭尔罗斯氏) clan  in 1728
 Lady of the First Rank (郡君), twelfth daughter
 Concubine, of the Zhang clan (章氏)
 Second daughter
Married Dondob of the Naiman Borjigin clan 
 Third daughter
 Sixteenth Daughter
 Concubine, of the Yuan clan (袁氏) 
 Sixteenth son (1730—1732)
 Concubine, of the Zhang clan (張氏)
 Yongjin (永瑾; 1717－1777), fifth son
 Yongting (永珽; 1719－1751, seventh son
 Eleventh son (1723－1723)
 Yongguan ( 永瓘; 1724－1800), twelfth son
 Yongpei (永珮; 1726 －1763), thirteenth so
 Fifteenth son (1730 — 1732)
 Eighteenth son (1739 －1754)
 Concubine, of the Wang (王氏)

Ancestry

See also 

 Prince Li
 Royal and noble ranks of the Qing dynasty
 Ranks of imperial consorts in China#Qing
 Coup of Hongxi

References 

1694 births
1742 deaths
Manchu politicians
Prisoners who died in Chinese detention
Qing dynasty politicians from Beijing